Pakt may refer to:

Ketchikan International Airport, with airport code PAKT.
Pakt (TV series), 2015-16 Polish TV series

See also
Pact (disambiguation)